Ilija Lukić (Serbian Cyrillic: Илија Лукић; 21 January 1942 – 13 June 2018) was a Serbian footballer who played as a forward.

Playing career
Lukić started playing in the youth teams of Belgrade's FK Železnik. In 1961, at age 19, he joined Second League FK Priština and he was soon regarded as one of the finest strikers in the country. That made attention turn to him and he signed with the FK Partizan that was having that season their historic achievement of reaching the 1966 European Cup Final that they lost to Real Madrid. After not getting many opportunities to play, he was moving next season to the California based Oakland Clippers where he would help the club win the 1967 National Professional Soccer League. Next year, he was back to Europe first in Dutch club Heracles Almelo and, after a disappointing season there, to Franch Ligue 1 club Stade Rennais. He stayed four seasons there becoming very popular among the fans. During this time the club had their most enjoyable period, winning the French Cup in 1971. Following season he moved to another Ligue 1 club FC Rouen before moving to Austria where he was appointed player-manager of Second League FC Linz. Eventually achieving their goal to play in the newly inaugurated Bundesliga, he finished his playing career as a player-manager of Belgian FC Berlaar.

Coaching career
During his successful, 30-year coaching career, he worked in 13 different clubs, at eight countries on three continents. He won four national championships, a treble with Al-Ittihad (Jeddah) in Saudi Arabia and one in UAE with Al Wasl. As the first coach of Al-Ittihad he also lifted four national cups in Saudi Arabia, and two in UAE, one with Al-Wasl and another with Sharjah FC. Together with Dimitri Davidovic he won in 1999 with Al-Ittihad the Asian Cup Winners Cup. As the manager of Al Ahli Jeddah he won in 2002 three big trophies: the Prince Faysal bin Fahad Tournament for Arab Clubs ( latter becoming the Arab Champions League, the Golf Club Champions Cup and Saudi Federation Cup.

He earned his degree in football from a Higher Coaching School of the Belgrade University's Faculty of Sport and Physical Education, as well as a Diploma from a University of California, San Francisco.

Personal life
Lukić was married to Mirjana and has two children, a son Ivan and a daughter Maria.

References

External links
 
 Partizan official website

1942 births
2018 deaths
Footballers from Belgrade
Serbian footballers
Yugoslav footballers
FC Prishtina players
FK Partizan players
Oakland Clippers players
Heracles Almelo players
Stade Rennais F.C. players
Expatriate footballers in the Netherlands
Ligue 1 players
Expatriate footballers in France
Association football forwards
Expatriate footballers in Austria
Expatriate footballers in Belgium
Expatriate soccer players in the United States
University of Belgrade Faculty of Sport and Physical Education alumni